David Brunell (born 1954) is an American pianist who has gained international recognition for his virtuosity and poetic temperament at the piano.

A native of St. Louis, he studied with Dorothy Dring Smutz, Sidney Foster, Zadel Skolovsky, Balint Vazsonyi, and Adele Marcus.  He has concertized widely throughout North America, Europe, and Latin America to critical acclaim.  Typical of this acclaim was a review in the St. Louis Post-Dispatch praising Brunell as "a big talent ... (with) exquisite taste ... formidable technique ... marvelous ideas ... it was thrilling!"

Also a master teacher, Brunell is currently a member of the artist faculty at the University of Tennessee School of Music. Prior to coming to Tennessee, Dr. Brunell taught at Saint Olaf College and at Indiana University.

External links 
 University of Tennessee School of Music

1954 births
Living people
American music educators